Cervera del Río Alhama is a town in the province and autonomous community of La Rioja, Spain.

Demographics

Population centres
 Cervera del Río Alhama
 Cabretón
 Las Ventas
 Rincón de Olivedo
 Valdegutur
 Valverde

Politics

Notable people 
Balthazar Alvarez.
Manuel Ibo Alfaro.
Ignacio Alonso Zapatero.
Daniel González.
Manuel Alfaro González
Eloy Alfaro Delgado
Manuel Gil, actor.
Angelita Alfaro.
Don Juan Manuel Zapatero Castillo.

References

Populated places in La Rioja (Spain)